Leibermuster is a German military camouflage pattern first used in 1945. It was the last of a family of German World War II camouflage patterns. The pattern (named after the brothers Leiber, its creators) was issued on a very limited basis to combat units before the war ended. It consists of bold irregular areas of black printed over brown and green on a pale background. 

Reproduction Leibermuster uniforms made in China and Turkey, created for collectors and reenactors, have become available on the market through European vendors. After the war, Leibermuster was the basis for the "pizza camouflage" issued to the Swiss army until the 1990s.

Development
The pattern was intended to provide some degree of camouflage in the infrared. It was the first pattern to be issued to both regular army (Wehrmacht) and Waffen-SS units. All known original images of the Leibermuster depict Wehrmacht soldiers stationed in former Czechoslovakia. There are no known images of Waffen-SS members wearing the Leibermuster.

References 

Camouflage patterns
German military uniforms
Military equipment introduced from 1945 to 1949